The 18th Canadian Film Awards were held on May 6, 1966 to honour achievements in Canadian film. The ceremony was hosted by Rich Little, and marked the first time that the ceremony was broadcast live by CBC Television.

Winners

Films
Film of the Year: The Mills of the Gods: Viet Nam — Canadian Broadcasting Corporation, Douglas Leiterman, Beryl Fox producers, Beryl Fox director
Feature Film: Le Festin des morts (Mission of Fear) — National Film Board of Canada, André Belleau producer, Fernand Dansereau director
Arts and Experimental: Syrinx — National Film Board of Canada, Ryan Larkin director
TV Information: Bernard Shaw: Who the Devil Was He? — Canadian Broadcasting Corporation, Vincent Tovell producer
Stravinsky — National Film Board of Canada, Roman Kroitor producer, Wolf Koenig and Roman Kroitor directors
Ladies and Gentlemen... Mr. Leonard Cohen — National Film Board of Canada, John Kemeny producer, Don Owen and Donald Brittain directors
Certificate of Merit: Huit témoins — National Film Board of Canada, André Belleau producer, Jacques Godbout director
Certificate of Merit:The Mills of the Gods: Viet Nam — Canadian Broadcasting Corporation, Douglas Leiterman, Beryl Fox producers, Beryl Fox director
TV Entertainment: How to Break a Quarter Horse — Canadian Broadcasting Corporation, Philip Keatley producer
Films for Children: Above the Horizon — National Film Board of Canada, Roman Kroitor and Hugh O'Connor producers and directors
Travel and Recreation: Shell 4000, 1965 — Moreland-Latchford Productions, Peter Gerretsen director
The Railrodder — National Film Board of Canada, Julian Biggs producer, Gerald Potterton director
General Information: Buster Keaton Rides Again — National Film Board of Canada, Julian Biggs producer, John Spotton director
Public Relations: Light for the Mind — Chetwynd Films, Arthur Chetwynd producer
Sales Promotion: Canadian Industries Ltd. — Moreland-Latchford Productions
Training and Instruction: The Scribe — Film Tele Productions, Ann Heeley-Ray and Kenneth Heeley-Ray producers, John Sebert director
Decision — Westminster Films, Lee Gordon producer
Amateur: Settlers — John W. Ruddell director
Certificate of Merit: Her Only Love — Scarborough Film Unit
Certificate of Merit: The Knife — Armand Bélanger director

Feature Film Craft Award
Black and White Cinematography: Georges Dufaux - Le Festin des morts (NFB)

Non-Feature Craft Awards
Colour Cinematography: Jean-Claude Labrecque and Bernard Gosselin, 60 Cycles (NFB)
Direction: Ron Kelly, The Gift
Film Editing: Don Owen, High Steel (NFB)

Special Awards
- Un jeu si simple (Such a Simple Game), National Film Board of Canada, Jacques Bobet producer, Gilles Groulx director - "for its success in emphasizing the excitement of hockey through the brilliant mixing of colour and black-and-white photography".
- Guy Roberge, former National Film Board of Canada Commissioner — "for his contribution to the growth of the Canadian film industry".

References

Canadian
Canadian Film Awards (1949–1978)
1966 in Canada
Culture of Montreal